Lionel Gondran (born 5 November 1966) is a French former weightlifter. He competed in the men's featherweight event at the 1988 Summer Olympics.

References

External links
 

1966 births
Living people
French male weightlifters
Olympic weightlifters of France
Weightlifters at the 1988 Summer Olympics
Sportspeople from Loiret
20th-century French people